Ticul de Morales Municipality is one of the 106 municipalities in Yucatán State, Mexico.  It is located in the western part of the state at  100 km south of the state capital city of Mérida. The municipality, which has an area of 355.12 km² (137.11 sq mi), in the 2005 census reported 25,621 inhabitants.  The city of Ticul which is the municipal seat had a population of 21,147, the ninth-largest community in the state in population.  The majority are ethnically Maya. Its largest other towns are Pustunich and Yotholín.

Climate

Communities

The municipality is made up of 32 communities the most important are as follows:

Ticul (Municipal Seat)
Pustunich
Yotholín
Plan Chac Número Cinco
Unidades de Riego

Important people

Francisco Ché Cacique de Ticul who ruled from 1562-1569.

Picture gallery

References

Municipalities of Yucatán